Rocky Ford is a census-designated place (CDP) in Delaware and Cherokee counties, Oklahoma, United States. The population was 61 at the 2010 census.

Geography
Rocky Ford is located in southwestern Delaware County and northern Cherokee County at  (36.171259, -94.910102). It is bordered to the north and east by Leach and to the southwest by Lowrey.

Demographics

As of the census of 2000, there were 60 people, 18 households, and 16 families residing in the CDP. The population density was 25.0 people per square mile (9.7/km2). There were 21 housing units at an average density of 8.7/sq mi (3.4/km2). The racial makeup of the CDP was 45.00% White, 46.67% Native American, and 8.33% from two or more races.

There were 18 households, out of which 61.1% had children under the age of 18 living with them, 77.8% were married couples living together, and 11.1% were non-families. 11.1% of all households were made up of individuals, and none had someone living alone who was 65 years of age or older. The average household size was 3.33 and the average family size was 3.63.

In the CDP, the population was spread out, with 41.7% under the age of 18, 8.3% from 18 to 24, 30.0% from 25 to 44, 16.7% from 45 to 64, and 3.3% who were 65 years of age or older. The median age was 26 years. For every 100 females, there were 130.8 males. For every 100 females age 18 and over, there were 118.8 males.

The median income for a household in the CDP was $31,875, and the median income for a family was $31,250. Males had a median income of $25,000 versus $40,833 for females. The per capita income for the CDP was $17,477. There were no families and 5.7% of the population living below the poverty line, including none under 18 and none of those over 64.

References

Census-designated places in Delaware County, Oklahoma
Census-designated places in Oklahoma